In enzymology, juglone 3-monooxygenase is an enzyme that catalyzes the chemical reaction

5-hydroxy-1,4-naphthoquinone + AH2 + O2  3,5-dihydroxy-1,4-naphthoquinone + A + H2O

The 3 substrates of this enzyme are 5-hydroxy-1,4-naphthoquinone, AH2, and O2, whereas its 3 products are 3,5-dihydroxy-1,4-naphthoquinone, A, and H2O.

This enzyme belongs to the family of oxidoreductases, specifically those acting on paired donors, with O2 as oxidant and incorporation or reduction of oxygen. The oxygen incorporated need not be derived from O miscellaneous. The systematic name of this enzyme class is 5-hydroxy-1,4-naphthoquinone,hydrogen-donor:oxygen oxidoreductase (3-hydroxylating). Other names in common use include juglone hydroxylase, naphthoquinone hydroxylase, and naphthoquinone-hydroxylase.

References

 

EC 1.14.99
Enzymes of unknown structure